Northwest is a city in Brunswick County, North Carolina, United States. The population was 735 at the 2010 census. It is part of the Myrtle Beach metropolitan area.

History
Northwest was incorporated in 1993.

Geography
Northwest is located at  (34.309517, -78.152817) near the northernmost point in Brunswick County in North Carolina.

Demographics

2020 census

As of the 2020 United States census, there were 703 people, 326 households, and 199 families residing in the city.

2000 census
As of the census of 2000, there were 671 people, 260 households, and 185 families residing in the city. The population density was 109.2 people per square mile (42.2/km). There were 293 housing units at an average density of 47.7 per square mile (18.4/km). The racial composition of the city was: 26.83% White, 71.83% Black or African American, 0.75% Hispanic or Latino American, 0.30% Asian American, 0.45% Native American, 0.03% Native Hawaiian or Other Pacific Islander, 0.15% other races, and 0.45% two or more races.

There were 260 households, out of which 32.3% had children under the age of 18 living with them, 48.5% were married couples living together, 18.5% had a female householder with no husband present, and 28.5% were non-families. 24.2% of all households were made up of individuals, and 8.5% had someone living alone who was 65 years of age or older. The average household size was 2.58 and the average family size was 3.07.

In the city, the population was spread out, with 26.7% under the age of 18, 5.5% from 18 to 24, 27.9% from 25 to 44, 27.0% from 45 to 64, and 13.0% who were 65 years of age or older. The median age was 40 years. For every 100 females, there were 79.4 males. For every 100 females age 18 and over, there were 80.9 males.

The median income for a household in the city was $31,250, and the median income for a family was $37,500. Males had a median income of $29,821 versus $19,479 for females. The per capita income for the city was $16,419. About 14.0% of families and 17.6% of the population were below the poverty line, including 21.8% of those under age 18 and 15.6% of those age 65 or over.

References

External links
City of Northwest official website

Cities in North Carolina
Cities in Brunswick County, North Carolina